XPT can mean multiple things:
 XPT - Гений без ни, мамин миллиардер, BOMJ.
 New South Wales XPT, passenger train operated by NSW TrainLink in New South Wales, Australia
 The XPT, a Windows software toolset for programmers
 The ISO 4217 code for the value of one troy ounce of platinum
 The filename extension .xpt is used for XPConnect typelibraries
 Xi Jinping Thought, the ruling ideology of the Communist Party of China in the 2010s